WNTJ (1490 AM, "News Talk 1490") is a radio station licensed to serve Johnstown, Pennsylvania, United States. The station, established in 1946, is currently owned by Seven Mountains Media and is a simulcast of WNTI out of Somerset, Pennsylvania.

It broadcasts a news/talk radio format including Pittsburgh Pirates baseball, Pittsburgh Penguins hockey, Pittsburgh Steelers football and select Fox News Radio programming.

The station was assigned the WNTJ call letters by the Federal Communications Commission on May 8, 2008.  Prior to 2008, this station was home to ESPN Radio affiliate WPRR, and before that, was the first home for WNTJ.

History: beginnings as WARD
First coming on the air in 1948, this station began as WARD.  Over the next decade, WARD would be joined by an FM station: WARD-FM/96.5 (now WFGI-FM at 95.5), and a UHF television station: WARD-TV/56 (now on virtual channel 19 as WPCW in Pittsburgh).

For many years, these three stations would be under common ownership, and operating as affiliates of the CBS radio and television networks.  The call letters for all three were changed from WARD to WJNL following its acquisition by Johnstown-based Jonel Construction Company in 1970.  This station was typical of one owned with a TV station, programming a full-service format with heavy emphasis on local news.  This business model continued into the start of the 1980s, when the organization fell onto hard times.  It began with the downturn of WJNL-TV, which lost its CBS affiliation to WTAJ-TV after the Johnstown and Altoona TV markets were merged into one.  The radio stations, already crippled by the fall of Johnstown's lucrative coal and steel industries, were unable to sustain the TV station's sudden drop in revenue, and the TV station was eventually sold off, leaving WJNL-AM-FM to continue on.

The radio stations continued to operate until the end of the decade, when both were acquired by Pennsylvania Broadcast Associates (dba Dame Media).  WJNL-FM underwent a format change and WJNL was reduced to simulcasting its FM sister 100 percent until a plan could be formulated for its future.

WJNL then became WNTJ, programming a format of full-service news and talk.  The station would maintain this format for approximately a decade until it was purchased in 2004 by Forever Broadcasting from Clear Channel Communications (who bought out Dame Media back in 1998).

Forever relocated WNTJ's talk format and call letters to their 850 kHz signal, turning the 1490 signal into an ESPN Radio affiliate - first recycling the WSPO call letters originally used on the 850 signal, then as WPRR with a sale of the station to 2510 Broadcasting.

In November 2007, a deal was reached to sell WPRR plus co-owned stations WCCL, WBHV, and WLKH to Forever Broadcasting Inc. (Carol Logan, president) for a reported combined sale price of $3 million. However, the FCC rejected approval for the deal, citing Forever's influence in the removal of Johnstown and its surrounding markets from the Arbitron ratings system.  As a result, 2510 Licenses LLC (Nicholas Galli, managing member) continued to own all four stations, though it allowed Forever to continue operating the stations through a local marketing agreement. Just over three years later, in February 2011, 2510 Licenses LLC sold WNTJ, WCCL, and WLKH outright to Forever Broadcasting. This time, however, the FCC granted approval for the deal, which was completed on April 30. Forever has since moved back the WNTJ format and call letters back to the 1490 kHz signal.

It was announced on October 12, 2022 that Forever Media is selling 34 stations, including WNTJ, WNTI, and the entire Johnstown cluster, to State College-based Seven Mountains Media for $17.3 million. The deal closed on January 2, 2023.

References

External links
The NTJ News Talk Network
http://foreverradio.com/sites/default/files/logos/wntj_1.png

NTJ
News and talk radio stations in the United States
Cambria County, Pennsylvania
Radio stations established in 1946
1946 establishments in Pennsylvania